Laurindo José da Silva Rabelo (July 8, 1826 – September 28, 1864) was a Brazilian Ultra-Romantic poet, teacher and medician. Famous for his lundu lyrics and satires, he won the epithet of "the Brazilian Bocage", and, because of his physical appearance, the nickname "Poeta-Lagartixa" ("Gecko-Poet").

He is the patron of the 26th chair of the Brazilian Academy of Letters.

Life
Rabelo was born in Rio de Janeiro in 1826, to Ricardo José da Silva Rabelo and Luísa Maria da Conceição. His parents were very poor. Initially, he planned to follow the ecclesiastic career, and entered in a seminary, but he quit, because of intrigues among his colleagues. He tried a course at the Academia Militar das Agulhas Negras, but he couldn't make it either. Finally, he entered in a Medicine course, finishing it in Bahia, but exercising his profession in Rio.

In 1857, he became a doctor for the Army, at Rio Grande do Sul, returning definitely to Rio in 1863, becoming a History, Geography and Portuguese teacher. In 1860, he married Adelaide Luísa Cordeiro, and could finally get rid of his poverty.

He died in 1864, due to heart problems.

Works
The only work written by Rabelo is the poetry book Trovas (Ballads), published in 1853. Trovas received many posthumous re-edits.

References

External links
 Excerpts of works by Laurindo Rabelo at the official site of the Brazilian Academy of Letters 
 Laurindo Rabelo's biography at the official site of the Brazilian Academy of Letters 

1826 births
1864 deaths
19th-century Brazilian poets
Romantic poets
Writers from Rio de Janeiro (city)
Patrons of the Brazilian Academy of Letters
Brazilian male poets
Brazilian medical writers
19th-century Brazilian male writers